Field sobriety tests (FSTs), also referred to as standardized field sobriety tests (SFSTs), are a battery of tests used by police officers to determine if a person suspected of impaired driving is intoxicated with alcohol or other drugs. FSTs (and SFSTs) are primarily used in the US, to meet "probable cause for arrest" requirements (or the equivalent), necessary to sustain an alcohol-impaired driving (DWI or DUI) conviction based on a chemical blood alcohol test.

Background

Impaired driving

Impaired driving, referred to as Driving under the influence (DUI), or Driving while intoxicated (DWI), is the crime of driving a motor vehicle while impaired by alcohol or other drugs (including recreational drugs and those prescribed by physicians), to a level that renders the driver incapable of operating a motor vehicle safely. People who receive multiple DUI offenses are often people struggling with alcoholism or alcohol dependence.

Traffic accidents are predominantly caused by driving under the influence; for people in Europe between the age of 15 and 29, DUI is one of the main causes of mortality. According to the National Highway Traffic Safety Administration alcohol-related crashes cause approximately $37 billion in damages annually. DUI and alcohol-related crashes produce an estimated $45 billion in damages every year. 

With alcohol, a drunk driver's level of intoxication is typically determined by a measurement of blood alcohol content or BAC; but this can also be expressed as a breath test measurement, often referred to as a BrAC. A BAC or BrAC measurement in excess of the specific threshold level, such as 0.08%, defines the criminal offense with no need to prove impairment. In some jurisdictions, there is an aggravated category of the offense at a higher BAC level, such as 0.12%, 0.15% or 0.20%. In many jurisdictions, police officers can conduct field tests of suspects to look for signs of intoxication. The US state of Colorado has a maximum blood content of THC for drivers who have consumed cannabis.

In most countries, driver's licence suspensions, fines and prison sentences for DUI offenders are used as a deterrent. Anyone who is convicted of driving while under the influence of alcohol or other drugs can be heavily fined and/or given a prison sentence. In some jurisdictions, impaired drivers who injure or kill another person while driving may face heavier penalties. In addition, many countries have prevention campaigns that use advertising to make people aware of the danger of driving while impaired and the potential fines and criminal charges, discourage impaired driving, and encourage drivers to take taxis or public transport home after using alcohol or drugs. In some jurisdictions, the bar that served an impaired driver may face civil liability. In some countries, non-profit advocacy organizations, a well-known example being Mothers Against Drunk Driving (MADD) run their own publicity campaigns against drunk driving.

History
The US National Highway Traffic Safety Administration (NHTSA) began research in 1975 on how to test suspects for impaired driving.  The NHTSA developed a series of tests that police officers could use when evaluating suspected impaired drivers. By 1981, officers in the United States began using the organization's battery of standardized sobriety tests to help make decisions about whether to arrest suspected impaired drivers. The tests were designed to indicate intoxication associated with a blood alcohol concentration (BAC) of 0.10%.

An early NHTSA report described a 6-test battery.  A 1981 report became the basis of SFTs used in the United States, including the NHTSA's Standardized Field Sobriety Test (SFST) battery published Mar-1999.

After some US states began lowering their BAC limits to 0.08%, a study was done to see if the battery could be used to detect BACs at or above 0.08% and above and below 0.04%. This was done to deal with the changes in the laws that led to lower legal BAC limits across the US.

Use of Field Sobriety Tests

One of the most controversial aspects of a DUI stop is the use of Field Sobriety Tests (FST). The National Highway Traffic Safety Administration (NHTSA) has developed a model system for managing Standardized Field Sobriety Test (SFST) training. They have published several training manuals associated with FSTs. As a result of the NHTSA studies, the walk-and-turn test was determined to be 79% accurate, and the one-leg stand test is 83% accurate when administered to people within the study parameters and confirming with a BAC at or over 0.08. The tests were not validated for people with medical conditions, injuries, 65 years or older, and 50 pounds or greater overweight. The officer will administer one or more field sobriety tests. FSTs are considered "divided attention tests" that test the suspect's ability to perform the type of mental and physical multitasking that is required to operate an automobile.  Nevertheless, these tests can be problematic for people with non-obvious disabilities affecting proprioception, such as Ehlers-Danlos syndrome (EDS).

Purpose 
FSTs and SFSTs are promoted as, "used to determine whether a subject is impaired", but FST tests are widely regarded having, as their primary purpose, establishing tangible evidence of "probable cause for arrest" ("reasonable grounds" in Canada).  A secondary purpose, is to provide supporting corroborative tangible evidence for use against the suspect for use at trial.  Probable cause is necessary under US law (4th Amendment) to sustain an arrest and invocation of the implied consent law.

Similar considerations apply under the Canadian requirement to establish "reasonable grounds" for making an approved instrument demand, by establishing that there is reasonable and probable cause which lies at the "point where credibly-based probability replaces suspicion".   It is likely that, if FSTs are being used, some equivalent to probable cause is necessary to sustain a conviction based on a demand for a chemical test.

While the primary purpose of FSTs is to document probable cause or the equivalent, in some jurisdictions, FST performance can be introduced as corroborating evidence of impairment.

Testing 
According to the NHTSA, a suspect does not "pass" or "fail" a field sobriety test, but rather the police determine whether "clues" are observed during the test.  Nevertheless, some of the literature will still include comments that a suspect "fails" one or more of these tests.

The three validated tests by NHTSA are:
The Horizontal Gaze Nystagmus Test, which involves following an object with the eyes (such as a pen) to determine characteristic eye movement reaction.
The Walk-and-Turn Test (heel-to-toe in a straight line). This test is designed to measure a person's ability to follow directions and remember a series of steps while dividing attention between physical and mental tasks.
The One-Leg-Stand Test

Alternative tests, which have not been "scientifically" validated by the NHTSA, include:
Romberg test, or the Modified-Position-of-Attention Test, (feet together, head back, eyes closed for thirty seconds).
The Finger-to-Nose Test (tip head back, eyes closed, touch the tip of nose with tip of index finger).
The Alphabet Test (recite all or part of the alphabet).
The Finger Count Test (touch each finger of hand to thumb counting with each touch (1, 2, 3, 4, 4, 3, 2, 1)).
The Counting Test (counting backwards from a number ending in a number other than 5 or 0 and stopping at a number ending other than 5 or 0. The series of numbers should be more than 15).
The Preliminary Alcohol Screening Test, PAS Test or PBT, (breathe into a "portable or preliminary breath tester", PAS Test or PBT).

Standardized Field Sobriety Tests (SFSTs) 
There were three tests chosen to constitute the "Standardized Field Sobriety Tests", which are:
 the Horizontal Gaze Nystagmus Test;
 the Walk and Turn Test; and
 the One-Leg Stand Test.

Although some law enforcement agencies continue to use a variety of these FSTs, most use the three-test battery of validated field sobriety tests, referred to as the Standardized Field Sobriety Test (SFST). The NHTSA-approved battery of tests consists of the Horizontal Gaze Nystagmus Test (HGN Test), the Walk-and-Turn Test (WAT), and the One-Leg-Stand Test (OLS).

In some states, e.g., Ohio, only the standardized tests will be admitted into evidence, provided they were administered and objectively scored "in substantial compliance" with NHTSA standards (ORC 4511.19(D)(4)(b)).

Horizontal Gaze Nystagmus Test (HGN) 
The first test that is typically administered is the Horizontal Gaze Nystagmus or HGN test, which is administered by the police officer checking the test subject's eyes. During this test, the officer looks for involuntary jerking of the suspect's eyes as they gaze toward the side. The officer checks for three clues in each eye, which gives six clues for this test.  The clues are: lack of smooth pursuit of the eyes, distinct and sustained nystagmus at the eyes' maximum deviation and nystagmus starting before the eyes reach 45 degrees.

Horizontal Gaze Nystagmus Instructions (HGN)
 I am going to check your eyes. (Please remove your glasses) 
 Keep your head still and follow the stimulus with your eyes only. 
 Do not move your head. 
 Do you understand the instructions?

Horizontal Gaze Nystagmus Evaluation
There are six cues or clues that a police officer is looking for on the Horizontal Gaze Nystagmus Test, they are as follows:
 Lack of smooth pursuit 
 Distinct and sustained nystagmus and maximum deviation 
 Onset of nystagmus prior to 45 degrees
Total Cues: 6 Cues - Decision Point: 4/6 Cues

While the original research indicated that 6 out of 6 clues (or cues) meant that a person was more likely above 0.08% at the time of the test, subsequent research conducted by the NHTSA has indicated that a "Hit" occurred when the number of reported signs for a given BAC fell within the range: a > 0.06% at 4–6 clues; a 0.05 – 0.059% at 2–4 clues; a 0.03 – 0.049% at 0–4 clues and a < 0.03% at 0–2 cues or clues.  The police may also then check for Vertical Gaze Nystagmus, which is used to test for high blood alcohol levels and/or the presence of certain drugs.

While the purpose is obtaining probable cause support for an arrest and possibly screening, in some jurisdictions, the HGN test may be used as corroborating evidence at the trial stage.  US jurisdictions differ on whether trial use of the HGN test requires that an expert establish a reliable foundation, as required under the Daubert standard

Walk and Turn Test (WAT) 
The second test that is usually administered is the Walk and Turn Test, or WAT Test. This test measures the suspect's ability to maintain their balance, walk in a straight line, and follow directions. To perform the test, the suspect will take nine heel-to-toe steps along a straight line during which time they must keep their arms to their side and count each step out loud. While the suspect performs this test, the officer is attempting to observe if the suspect fails to follow instructions; is having difficulty keeping their balance; stops walking in order to regain their balance; takes an incorrect number of steps; or fails to walk the line heel-to-toe.

The walk-and-turn test is composed of two phases: the Instruction Phase and Walking Phase. During the test, the individual is directed to take nine steps along a straight line.  The individual is supposed to walk heel to toe, and while looking down at a real or imaginary line, count the steps out loud.  The test subject's arms must remain at their side.  Reaching the ending point, the individual must turn around using a series of small steps, and return to the starting point. The proper instruction, according to the NHTSA Guidelines, is as follows:

Walk-and-Turn test instructions
 Put your left foot on the line, then place your right foot on the line ahead of your left, with the heel of your right foot against the toe of your left foot. 
 Do not start until I tell you to do so. 
 Do you understand? (must receive affirmative response) 
 When I tell you to begin, take 9 heel-to-toe steps on the line (demonstrate) and take 9 heel-to-toe steps back down the line. 
 When you turn on the ninth step, keep your front foot on the line and turn taking several small steps with the other foot (demonstrate) and take 9 heel-to-toe steps back down the line. 
 Ensure you look at your feet, count each step out loud, keep your arms at your side, ensure you touch heel-to-toe and do not stop until you have completed the test.
 Do you understand the instructions? 
 You may begin. 
 If the suspect does not understand some part of the instructions, only the part in which the suspect does not understand should be repeated

Walk-and-Turn test evaluation
There are eight cues or clues that a police officer is looking for on the Walk & Turn Test; they are as follows:
 Can’t keep balance during instructions
 Starts too soon
 Stops walking
 Misses heel-to-toe
 Steps off line
 Uses arms for balance
 Improper turn
 Incorrect number of steps
Total cues: 8 cues – Decision point: 2/8 cues

One Leg Stand test (OLS) 
The other standardized test is the One Leg Stand (OLS). The OLS test requires the suspect to stand on one leg for 30 seconds and also measures balance, coordination, and similar to the WAT test, divides the suspect's attention.  The officer is looking for any of the four possible clues: Sways while balancing, uses arms for balance, hopping and puts their foot down.

The One-Leg Stand test is composed of two stages: the Instruction Phase and Balancing Phase. The proper instruction, according to the NHTSA Guidelines, is as follows:

One-Leg Stand test instructions
 Stand with your feet together and your arms at your side (demonstrate).  
 Maintain position until told otherwise.  
 When I tell you to, I want you to raise one leg, either one, approximately 6 inches off the ground, foot pointed out, both legs straight and look at the elevated foot. Count out loud in the following manner: 1001, 1002, 1003, 1004 and so on until told to stop.
 Do you understand the instructions?  
 You may begin the test.

One-Leg Stand Test evaluation
There are four cues or clues that a police officer is looking for on the One-Leg Stand Test; they are as follows:
 Sways while balancing
 Uses arms to balance
 Hops
 Puts foot down
Total cues: 4 cues – Decision point: 2/4 cues

Non-standardized tests 
The term "non-standardized" references the NHTSA SFSTs, sometimes referenced by the NHTSA as "other sobriety tests".  The NHTSA indicates that the non-standardized tests are either "not scientifically reliable", with some assertions that SFSTs can be used to estimate 0.08% BAC.  Nevertheless, these tests are common in North America, because the primary purpose of FSTs is to establish probable cause to sustain an arrest and invoke the implied consent law.

"Non-standardized tests" include sequentially touching fingertips while counting forward and backward, touching the nose, alphabet recitals and Romberg's test (stationary balance, test for Romberg's sign).

Preliminary Breath Test (PBT) or Preliminary Alcohol Screening test (PAS)

The Preliminary Breath Test (PBT) or Preliminary Alcohol Screening test (PAS) is sometimes categorised as part of field sobriety testing, although it is not part of the series of performance tests.  The PBT (or PAS) uses a portable breath tester, but its primary use is for screening and establishing probable cause for arrest, to invoke the implied consent requirements or to establish "reasonable grounds" for making an approved instrument demand in Canada.

Different requirements apply in many states to drivers under DUI probation, in which case participation in a preliminary breath test (PBT) may be a condition of probation, and for commercial drivers under "drug screening" requirements.  Some US states, notably California, have statutes on the books penalizing PBT refusal for drivers under 21; however the Constitutionality of those statutes has not been tested.  (As a practical matter, most criminal lawyers advise not engaging in discussion or "justifying" a refusal with the police.)

In Canada, PBT refusal may be considered a refusal offense under Canada Criminal Code § 254.  The status of PBT refusal in Australia is unclear, although in Western Australia it appears to mandate submission to PBTs under the Road Traffic Act 1974.  (National states without probable cause or "reasonable grounds" requirements are of course likely to be less restrictive on PBT/PAS requirements.)

Limitations and criticism 

FSTs are considered subjective.  Additionally, their applicability to large segments of the population is limited.

Critics of standardized field sobriety tests often question the statistical evidence behind them, and the ability of the officers to administer the tests and actually judge for impairments related to alcohol.  According to Barone, one study involved completely sober individuals who were asked to perform the standardized field sobriety tests, and their performances were videotaped. "After viewing the 21 videos of sober individuals taking the standardized field tests, the police officers believed that forty-six percent of the individuals had 'too much to drink'".  The NHTSA's 1977 study had an error rate of 47 percent, and the 1981 study had an error rate of 32 percent, which is considered unusually high for a scientific study.

One of the main criticisms of field sobriety tests is that the judgment is left up to the discretion of the police officer.  An officer may have some bias towards a suspect and judge the test more critically than necessary.  Additionally, it is almost impossible to tell whether or not a police officer used proper procedures for administering the field sobriety test when a case is brought to court.  The original research conducted by the NHTSA is often disputed because of the manner in which they were conducted and the conclusions that were reported.

One author alleges that FSD analysis reports do not meet scientific peer review standards: "The reports for all three studies issued by NHTSA are lacking much of the material and analysis expected in a scientific paper, and none have been published in peer-reviewed journals" (Rubenzer 2008; Rubenzer 2011).

As noted above, these tests can be problematic for people with non-obvious disabilities affecting proprioception, such as Ehlers-Danlos syndrome (EDS).  Conditions affecting mobility, physical ailments and age adversely affect performance on FSTs.

Walk-and-turn test criticisms 
One of the main problems with the walk-and-turn test is that some of the signs of alcohol impairment may stem from other physical problems.  Along with that, there are other signs of physical impairment that can stem from various causes, including fatigue, an injury or illness, and nervousness.  Those who are physically inactive, elderly, or obese may have trouble completing the walk-and-turn test without flaw. The NHTSA used to say that those who are 50 pounds or more overweight may have difficulty performing the test, and that the suspect must walk along a real line.  "Later NHTSA manuals removed the weight comment, and also inserted the phrase 'imaginary line' at the instruction phase, even though original research always used a visible line".  The fact that officers are no longer required to provide a line for the suspect to walk along may affect the outcome of the test, and often adds to the scrutiny received from critics.

Field sobriety test refusals 
In all US jurisdictions, participation in a Field Sobriety Test is voluntary.  (Police are not obliged to advise the suspect that participation in a FST or other pre-arrest procedures is voluntary.  In contrast, formal evidentiary tests given under implied consent requirements are considered mandatory.)

A suspect requested to participate in a Field Sobriety Test is likely to be told that the purpose is to determine whether the suspect is impaired; however, FST tests are widely regarded as having, as their primary purpose, gaining tangible evidence for use against the suspect.  The evidence is important in the establishment of probable cause for arrest.  Since probable cause is necessary under US law (4th Amendment) to sustain an arrest and invocation of the implied consent law, it is important that the police document probable cause.

"HGN first" 

The NHTSA recommends administering the HGN test as the first of the SFSTs, but does not state the reason.  FSTs are voluntary, so consideration is given to encourage suspects to comply with requests to participate in the tests.   The HST is characterized by the tester performing a visible activity, so the suspect is less likely to decline at that stage.  The completion of one test increases the likelihood that the suspect will participate in follow-up FSTs.  The suspect may also perceive the HGN (as administered) as having a scientific foundation.

In cases in which a PBT (or PAS) is administered first, the HGN may be administered after completion of other SFSTs, as the purpose of administering the HGN first is obviated by the PBT/PAS.

National procedures 
FSTs are primarily used in national states that require the police establish probable cause for arrest (reasonable grounds in Canada) as a prerequisite for requiring a chemical blood alcohol test.  FSTs are generally regarded as a curiosity elsewhere.

Australia 

To determine impairment in countries such as Australia, a simple breath or urine test is often taken. If police suspect that a driver is under the influence of a substance such as alcohol, then the driver will undergo a breath test. If over the legal limit of 0.05g per 100 millilitres of blood, then a second breath test will be taken and used as evidence against the driver when charged with the offence. If a person is suspected to be under the influence of an illegal drug, they will be required to supply a urine sample. If the urine sample is positive, then the urine is sent for more testing to determine the exact drug taken (confirmation of being illegal or prescribed). A similar process to being over the legal BAC level is undertaken using the evidence to penalise the user.

Canada 

Commentary varies on taking SFSTs in Canada.  Some sources, especially official ones, indicate that the SFSTs are mandatory, and required under § 254(2)(a) of the Criminal code, whereas other sources are silent on FST testing.  The assertion regarding mandatory compliance with SFSTs is based on "failure to comply with a demand", as an offence under § 254(5) of the Criminal Code, but it is unclear how refusal of SFSTs under § 254(2)(a) are treated (provided the suspect agrees to take a chemical test).  N.B.: There are some reports that refusal to submit to an SFST can result in the same penalties as impaired driving.

Nevertheless, it is unclear whether there has ever been a prosecution under this interpretation of "failure to comply with a demand" as applied to SFSTs.  Canada Criminal Code § 254(1) and (5) addresses this, but only with respect to chemical testing (breath, blood, etc.)

United States 

United States law on DUI primarily falls under state law, but is still subject to federal Constitutional requirements.  Thus, in all jurisdictions, participation in FSTs is voluntary.

In the US, the legal procedure is police stop (Police stop requiring "reasonable suspicion" or another qualified reason for a police stop), probable cause, and arrest.  FSTs are requested in the police stop phase, and are used to provide tangible evidence sufficient to meet the requirements for probable cause for an arrest.  Evidential tests are performed in the arrest stage, although the terminology may vary.  Regardless of the terminology, in order to sustain a conviction based on evidential tests, probable cause must be shown (or the suspect must volunteer to take the evidential test without implied consent requirements being invoked).

Police are not obliged to advise the suspect that participation in a FST or other pre-arrest procedures is voluntary.  In contrast, formal evidentiary tests given under implied consent requirements are considered mandatory.

References

Alcohol law
Driving under the influence